Gracilodes is a genus of moths in the family Erebidae.

Species
Species include:
 Gracilodes angulalis -  Guillermet, 1992
 Gracilodes angustipennis -  Gaede 1940
 Gracilodes caffra -  Guenee 1852
 Gracilodes disticha -  Hampson 1926
 Gracilodes finissima -  Berio 1956
 Gracilodes fuscosa -  (Holland 1894)
 Gracilodes metopis -  Hampson 1926
 Gracilodes nyctichroa -  Hampson 1926
 Gracilodes nysa -  Guenee 1852
 Gracilodes opisthenops -  Hampson 1926

References

Natural History Museum Lepidoptera genus database

Pangraptinae
Moth genera